Mrunal Devdhar (born 16 December 1992) is an Indian cricketer. He made his Twenty20 debut on 2 January 2016 in the 2015–16 Syed Mushtaq Ali Trophy. He made his first-class debut for Railways in the 2016–17 Ranji Trophy on 13 October 2016. He made his List A debut for Railways in the 2016–17 Vijay Hazare Trophy on 25 February 2017.

References

External links
 

1992 births
Living people
Indian cricketers
Baroda cricketers
Railways cricketers
People from Vadodara